Senna bicapsularis is a species of the legume genus Senna, native to northern South America, from Panama south to Venezuela and Colombia, and also the West Indies. Common names include rambling senna (formerly "cassia"), winter cassia, Christmas bush, money bush, and yellow candlewood. In Florida, Senna pendula is usually cultivated as, and misapplied to, S. bicapsularis.

Description
It is a semi-evergreen shrub growing to 3.5 m tall with a low spreading crown that reproduces by seed. It can grow from 2 - 12 metres tall and it branches from near the base.

The leaves are 2.5–9 cm long, pinnate, with six to eight leaflets; the leaflets are 1.6–4.5 cm long and 1.1–2.3 cm broad. The yellow flowers are produced in masses with a few together on short racemes and 12–16 mm long. The plant flowers from autumn to winter, attracting bees and butterflies.

Senna bicapsularis is distinguished from Senna pendula by having 3 pairs of leaflets on each leaf and elongated pedicels (flower stalks), while 'S. pendula' has 4-7 pairs of leaflets on each leaf and a gland between each pair of leaflets, with shorter flower stalks. S. bicapsularis flowers from late fall to winter depending on climate, whilst 'S. pendula' can flower from as early as late summer. Senna pendula can grow very easily from seed, while bicapsularis has a tough seed coat that needs mechanical scarification to sprout with success.

Uses
The Nahuas of San Luis Potosi resort to this plant for the healing of the enchantment. For this reason, the patient is cleaned with seven leaves of its leaves, passing them throughout the body. Likewise, as part of this treatment, while the healer prays, he perfumes the patient's body with a charcoal, rosemary and copal incense and then cleanses it with an egg to remove the "bad air" that has taken possession of his body.

The leaves are edible and are used to cure erysipelas in Morelos, and as an antiseptic in Oaxaca. The sap from emaciated leaves can be used externally, with salt, to heal rashes, sores, bites, stings, eczema, scabies, ringworm and thrush. In the 20th century, Maximino Martínez points out the following uses: cathartic and to counteract the effects of arthropod stings.

The seedpod flavour resembles tamarind. The leaves can be cooked as a vegetable, which can be mixed with other leaves, beans or peas.

Invasive species
It is naturalised and invasive in several coastal areas in the tropics, including Tanzania, Kenya, the Galápagos Islands and New Caledonia, where it is found in roadsides and disturbed areas, wooded grasslands, fallow land and riparian zones.

Chemistry
The leaves and stems contain chaksinelike alkaloids. The seeds contain galactomannan. The presence in the plant of cassin , 2,6-dialkyl-3-hydroxypyridine and socassidine has also been reported

Synonyms

Senna bicapsularis has been described under a wide variety of names that are today considered its synonyms. Some of these were also applied to related plants in error. This phenomenon has happened with other taxa, which were mis-applied to this plant:
 Adipera bicapsularis (L.) Britton & Wilson
 Adipera spiciflora Pittier
 Cassia berterii Colla
 Cassia bicapsularis L.
Cassia bicapsularis sensu Bojer is erroneous for Senna pendula.
Cassia bicapsularis of other authors is erroneous for Senna pendula var. glabrata
 Cassia bicapsularis L. var. aristata DC.
Cassia aristata Benth. is a synonym of Chamaecrista aristata
 Cassia bicapsularis L. var. quadrijuga DC.
 Cassia collae G.Don
 Cassia emarginata L.
Cassia emarginata Clos is a synonym of Senna candolleana
Cassia emarginata Mill. is a synonym of Chamaecrista pilosa
 Cassia inflata Spreng.
 Cassia laevigata sensu Prain
Cassia laevigata Willd. is a synonym of Senna septemtrionalis
Cassia laevigata of other authors  is erroneous for Senna occidentalis
 Cassia limensis Lam.
 Cassia sennoides Jacq.
 Cassia spiciflora (Pittier) Pittier
 Cathartocarpus bicapsularis (L.) Ham.
 Chamaefistula inflata G.Don
 Isandrina arborescens Raf.
 Isandrina emarginata (L.) Britton & Rose

Footnotes

References
  (2005): Senna bicapsularis. Version 10.01, November 2005. Retrieved 2007-DEC-20.
  (2006): Senna bicapsularis. Version of 2006-OCT-25. Retrieved 2007-DEC-20.
  (2007): Germplasm Resources Information Network - Senna bicapsularis. Retrieved 2007-DEC-20.

bicapsularis
Plants described in 1753
Taxa named by Carl Linnaeus
Flora of Panama
Flora of Venezuela
Flora of Colombia
Flora of Mexico